Montjovet is a town and comune in the Aosta Valley region of north-western Italy. Montjovet lies in the lower  Aosta Valley, between France and Switzerland. 
Though it only has an area of 18.7 square kilometers, the commune has 50 villages and hamlets, and a number of hills, the highest of which is Mont Lyan, at 2174 metres. Historically, the parish was under the control of the Bishop of Aosta. The current main parish church, Parrocchia della Natività della Vergine Maria, opened in 1837.

History
The parish has a long history, and was mentioned as being under the control of the Bishop of Aosta in Pope Alexander III's ecclesia sancti Eusebii de Plubeio of 20 April 1176. In the 13th century, a massive landslide altered a lot of the terrain in the commune, destroying the original parish church. The seat of the parish was at Borso for a period, and it was originally administered by diocesan priests. It was ceded in 1433 to the provost of Saint-Gilles of Verrès, which it remained under until the mid 18th century when it was returned to Borso. For a period, the Challant family of nobles had the right to appoint the parish priest at the Parrocchia della Natività della Vergine Maria church.

Geography
Part of the Evançon Mountain Community in the lower Aosta Valley, it is strategically placed between France and Switzerland. Montjovet has the largest number of villages of any commune in the valley, with 50. It covers an area of 18.7 square kilometers, with numerous plains and hills, including the 370 metre hill Plout on the border with Verrès, up to the highest point, Mont Lyan, at 2174 metres.

Landmarks

The current parish church, Parrocchia della Natività della Vergine Maria, commenced construction in 1830 and was consecrated on 3 May 1837. The Parrocchia di Saint Germain church was consecrated on 1 May 1704, and retains a 16th century bell tower from a previous church. The rectangular church has a large portico at the entrance. Chiesa del Grand Hoel was built in 1630 and underwent reconstruction in 1830.  Chiesa Meran was built in 1775, while the Chiesa Barmachande was erected in 1878. Other churches include Chiesa Rodoz, Chiesa Guaz, Chiesa Plout, Chiesa Barmas, Chiesa Estaod, Chiesa Ciresan and Chiesa Chenal.

References

External links

Official site

Cities and towns in Aosta Valley